Football at the Bolivarian Games has been played since 1938. The first edition was the only one in which full national teams played for all countries. The tournament is organisedc by Organización Deportiva Bolivariana (English: Bolivarian Sport Organization).

U-17 teams have been fielded recently in this quadrennial competition. A women's tournament played by full national teams was added in 2005.

Men's tournament

Results

Medal count

Details

I Games 

(Bogotá, 1938)

This was the only edition in which full national teams participated for every country.

II Games 

(Lima, 1947–48)

There was a tie for second place and two silver medals were awarded. Only Bolivia and Venezuela fielded full national teams.

III Games 

(Caracas, 1951)

IV Games 

(Barranquilla, 1961)

V Games 

(Quito/Guayaquil, 1965)

VI Games 

(Maracaibo, 1970)

VII Games 

(Panama City, 1973)

There was a tie for third place and two bronze medals were awarded.

VIII Games 

(La Paz, 1977)

IX Games 

(Barquisimeto, 1981)

X Games 

(Ambato/Cuenca/Puerto Viejo, 1985)

The competition featured only U-20 teams for the first time.

XI Games 

(Maracaibo, 1989)

A dispute about which level of teams should be fielded led to the cancellation of the football tournament.

XII Games 

(Santa Cruz/Cochambamba, 1993)

The competition featured only U-20 teams for the first time.

XIII Games 

(Arequipa, 1997)

XIV Games 

(Ambato, 2001)

XV Games 

(Armenia/Pereira, 2005)

Women's tournament

Results

Medal count

Details

XV Games 

(Armenia/Pereira, 2005)

References

External links
 

 
International association football competitions in South America
Sports at the Bolivarian Games
Bolivarian Games